William Strahan may refer to:

 William Strahan (publisher) (1715–1785), printer and publisher
 William Henry Strahan (1869–1915), Australian soldier and poet
 William Strahan (cricketer) (1807–1886), English cricketer